The PNR 900 class is a class of 21 GE Universal Series diesel–electric locomotives operated by the Philippine National Railways since 1973. The locomotives comes with 3 different types: U14CP (1973), U14C (1979), and U15C (1991). Initially used for long-distance express services throughout Luzon, they were relegated to hauling commuter trains within Metro Manila, a task previously done by PNR's diesel multiple units fleet. This was further exacerbated by the closure of the PNR South Main Line's intercity section in 2012 after an accident in Sariaya, Quezon.

History

The GE U14C and U15C are second-generation Universal Series road switchers specially built by GE Transportation for the Philippine National Railways. These were ordered in the 1970s to augment and eventually replace the aging diesel locomotive fleet purchased by PNR's predecessor, the Manila Railroad Company. The locomotives to be replaced include the 1000 class streamliners and the 2000 class roadswitchers, the latter being a first-generation Universal Series locomotive and both entered service in 1956. Despite the earlier diesel locomotives initially having 4 digits, the numbering scheme for the new 900 class has three and seems to follow the numbering scheme of the Manila Railroad 800 class USA locomotives built 30 years prior.

The first batch of five GE U15C locomotives was ordered in 1973 for ₱10 million (equivalent to US$9.07 million in 2021) and were constructed by GE in Erie, Pennsylvania. The last two units were delivered in February 1974. A second order of ten U14C locomotives were ordered in the late 1970s and were also built in Pennsylvania. They arrived between January and February 1979.

The locomotives were used on various express services throughout the PNR network such as the Amianan Express and the Bicol Express. Locomotives used on the North Main Line locomotives are distinguishable from its southern counterparts by the color of the "whiskers" on the cab, with the former being colored white and the latter being colored light yellow. At the same time, the long-distance coaching stock were given a dark green and yellow livery to suit the locomotives.

The last six locomotives were built by GE in the former Montreal Locomotive Works plant in Montreal, Quebec, Canada. They entered service in 1992 together with the ten 5000 class locomotives, and had a red paint that will be later incorporated into the Philippines 2000 livery. At the same time, earlier locomotives such as 902 were repainted in the same paint scheme. These locomotives were mostly used for Metrotren commuter rail services in the 1990s until the late 2000s.

Rehabilitation

In 2014, PNR signed a contract consortium deal with Miescorrail (now MRail), a subsidiary of Meralco and Desco Inc. to upgrade its locomotives. It is PNR's first upgrade to its 26 locomotives since its acquisition in 1992. The deal involves the disassembly of two of the three locomotives in the first quarter of 2015. The diesel engines will be shipped to a GE facility for a complete upgrade including the installation of the GE Bright Star (BSS) engine control system, a micro-processor based computerized system to provide reliable and efficient performance of the engine. Meanwhile, the brakes and alternators will be repaired by Desco and MRail. The refurbishment started in 2015, and Desco and MRail handed over the two locomotives in February 2017.

From 2019, PNR repainted the locomotives to an orange livery in anticipation of the arrival of the new trains from PT INKA. 6 locomotives are currently in the orange livery as of November 2022.

Since 2020, Desco Inc. is the company carrying out rehabilitation in the 900 class locomotives, with two units currently under rehabilitation.

Design

GE U14C and U15C
The U15C and the U14C were the same, but the difference is the batch number, engine block, radiator grills, and date of arrival. U15C were the 1st batch while the U14C were the 2nd batch. The U14Cs don't have numbering signage but when they were rehabilitated, they now have number signs with lights and wipers were working again.

GE U15C (later batch)
Compared to the U14Cs, the U15cs features number signs. When they were rehabilitated, they feature number lights.

Build Numbers

Status
As of October 2022, 6 units are active, 2 units are inactive, 2 units are undergoing rehabilitation, 3 units are declared under beyond economical repair, and 8 were scrapped.

Incidents and accidents

The PNR 900 class locomotives has been involved in various incidents such as derailments, engine problems, collisions, and even attacks by the NPAs during the Ferdinand Marcos administration.
Del 901 was involved in a derailment in 1979. The locomotive was the first to be built yet the first to be scrapped.
On December 31, 1982, DEL 905 and 910 collided  between Hondagua and Calauag Stations at Quezon Province. Both drivers were given Line Clear Certificate by the Station Masters in both stations (905 was heading Northbound while 910 was heading Southbound).
DEL 908 reportedly hit Bim Bassman (Jian Garcia)'s son sometime in the mid 1980s.  The officer retaliated by targeting Unit 908 on several occasions, throwing stones, firing bullets, and even hurling a grenade which detonated and injured crew members. PNR officials have renumbered 908 as 916 to avoid further attacks on the locomotive.
DEL 912 was bombed by the New People's Army during the tenure of the late President Ferdinand Marcos in the 1980s. The locomotive was written off. 
DEL 920 collided with a dump truck in Iriga while travelling to Legazpi in 2001. The locomotive's chassis was twisted, causing the locomotive beyond economical repair. PNR planned to revive 920 by placing 904's cab to 920.
DEL 922 was involved in the Sariaya derailment on November 12, 2004. The Manila-bound Bicol Express train derailed and fell into a ravine, killing 10 people and injuring 160 more. This later ordered for a total halt for all intercity services of the PNR until 2011.
On October 26, 2012, 922 hauling coaches servicing as Bicol Express Train 611 rolled over while traveling on a rainy weather in Sariaya, Quezon. The bridge was washed out, causing the coaches to roll over. The rainfall was caused by Typhoon Son-Tinh (known as Tropical Storm Ofel). As a result of the incident, 5 passengers were injured, and the Bicol Express was suspended indefinitely although intercity services continued until 2013.
On October 12, 2015, MSC 1300 performed by the 914 and a 203 series EMU stopped near Nichols station due to engine overheating caused by 914. DEL 2535 was sent to rescue the breakdown train.
On July 7, 2017, five people, including a pregnant woman, was hurt when an ambulance was hit by 916 near Blumentritt Station in Manila. The ambulance, which came from Barangay 167 Ilano in Caloocan, was on its way to a hospital to bring the pregnant woman when the accident occurred.
On June 23, 2018, 919's cab was damaged after colliding a truck at a railway crossing near Paco Station.
On September 11, 2019, 916 hauling a 203 series EMU stopped at Paco station. A few moments later, 916's engine started overheating.
A man got run over by DEL 917 at the Abad Santos Triangle in Tondo, Manila on October 2, 2019. The man died as a result of the incident.
On April 13, 2020, amidst the Enhanced community quarantine in Luzon due to the COVID-19 pandemic, a group of residents barricaded a portion of the rail tracks in Calamba, Laguna that prevented DEL 921 from entering a Barangay that was under total lockdown.
On April 12, 2022, a 9-to-12-year-old child died after being run over by DEL 921 hauling a 203 series EMU train at the intersection of Antipolo Street and Ipil Street in Sta. Cruz, Manila.

Liveries

The PNR 900 class, as well as the PNR 2500 class and the PNR 5000 class, were painted in various liveries.

Green livery (1973-1980)

The first livery of the 900 class was the Green livery. The livery has two variations:

Locomotives with White whisker are designated for northern trips (La Union) while locomotives with Yellow whiskers are designated for southern trips (Bicol). There are locomotives with white whiskers running on the PNR South Main Line even though they are designated on the PNR North Main Line. This is due to lack of available locomotives for southern trips. The livery lasted until 1980.

Yellow livery (1980-1990)

The 2nd livery of the 900 class is the Yellow livery. It features a green whiskers and PNR logo. The livery lasted until 1990.

Red Philippines 2000 livery (1991-2000)

Prior to the arrival of the PNR 5000 class and the last batch of the 900 class in 1991, the U14C locomotives and the PNR 2500 class locomotives were repainted in Red Philippines 2000 livery. Unlike the newer locomotives which features a black cowcatcher and lining, the old locomotives were yellow. The 2500 class features a Metrotren signage at the front. The livery lasted in 2000. DEL 5010 was the last unit in Red livery.

Blue livery (2001-2010)

Dubbed as Blue whale, all locomotives were repainted in Blue livery. The livery was used until 2010 when the PNR Hyundai Rotem DMUs arrived in the Philippines in 2009. All locomotives that are under Beyond Economical Repair in Caloocan workshop were still painted in Blue whale livery except for 5010.

Filtrack and Blue-Gold liveries (2011-2013)

Before the reopening of the Bicol Express, the locomotives were repainted in Filtrack livery. Locomotives with Filtrack livery were designated for the Bicol commuter line. The locomotives were repainted into Blue-Gold livery when the Bicol Express was reopened. The livery lasted until 2013 when intercity services on the PNR South Main Line were suspended after the derailment of the Bicol Express on October 26, 2012. DEL 2538 was the last unit wearing the Blue-Gold livery.

Blue orange livery (2013-2021)

When the 203 series entered service on the PNR Metro South Commuter Line, the locomotives were repainted in Blue-Orange livery in 2013. They were repainted in 2015 when PNR closed their commuter services due to the Derailment of DMU set 3.

Some locomotives rehabilitated by MRail and DESCO retained the blue-orange livery until some locomotives were repainted into the current orange,

Orange livery (2019-present)

In August 2019, 917 was repainted in Orange livery. The repainting is also part of the rehabilitation of the old rolling stocks of PNR and the arrival of new INKA trains. 917 was the first locomotive to wear the Orange livery, followed by 921 in May 2021. 922 was repainted in Orange livery in June 2021, but without PNR logos yet. 902 and 913 were repainted in Orange livery after their rehabilitation in DESCO. 914 and 916 are now under rehabilitation and will receive the new livery. 919 is the last units wearing the Blue-orange livery. In January 2022, 913 underwent test runs after staying in the PNR Caloocan workshops for finishing touches. It re-entered service as an MSC hauler in February 2022.

Gallery

See also
PNR 2500 Class
PNR 5000 Class
INKA CC300
South African Class 35-000 – another diesel-electric locomotive based on the GE U15C model

Notes

References

Philippine National Railways
Rolling stock of the Philippines
Railway locomotives introduced in 1973
3 ft 6 in gauge locomotives